Lele  is an East Chadic language spoken in the Tandjilé Region, in the Tandjilé Ouest department, south of Kélo.

Phonology

Vowels
Lele has five underlying vowels. The mid vowels are lower mid rather than higher mid. All vowels may have long variants.

{| class="wikitable"
|+ IPA Chart for Vowels of Lele
!   
! colspan="1" | Front
! colspan="1" | Central
! colspan="1" | Back
|-align=center class=small
|-align=center
! High
|  || ||  
|-align=center
!  Mid
|   ||  || 
|-align=center
!  Low
|  ||  ||
|}

Consonants
There are some asymmetries in Lele's consonant inventory.

{| class="wikitable" style=text-align:center
|+Lele consonants
! colspan=2| 
! Labial
! Alveolar
! Palatal
! Velar
! Labio-velar
! Glottal
|-
! colspan=2| Nasal
| 
| 
| 
| 
| 
| 
|-
! rowspan=4| Plosive
! 
| 
| 
| 
| 
| 
| 
|- 
! 
| 
| 
| 
| 
| 
| 
|- 
! 
| 
| 
| 
| 
| 
| 
|- 
! 
| 
| 
| 
| 
| 
| 
|- 
! colspan=2| Fricative 
| 
| 
| 
| 
| 
| 
|- 
! colspan=2| Trill
| 
| 
| 
| 
| 
| 
|-
! rowspan=2| Approximant
! 
| 
| 
| 
| 
|
| 
|-
! 
| 
| 
| 
| 
| 
| 
|}

Grammar

Nouns

Nouns are grammatically masculine or feminine, but there are no morphological markings of gender on the nouns. This distinction is only seen in the agreement system (covert gender). Only a subset of nouns are marked for plural: large animals, kinship terms and a few inanimate objects. Plurals nouns are marked in a variety of ways including a suffix /-e/ or /-we/ and an infix /-a-/. There are three nouns that have irregular plural forms: "woman", "hen" and "person".

There is a grammatical distinction between alienable and inalienable possession in the noun phrase. In inalienable possession, a singular possessor is marked by a suffix on the noun indexing the possessor (possessor agreement suffix). In plural inalienable possession and all alienable, the possessor is indexed by a pronominal word following the noun.

Verbs

The tense-aspect-mood system includes four verbal forms labeled "past", "future", "nominal" and "imperative". The "past" form normally has a stem-final vowel /i/. The "future" and "nominal" forms both have a stem-final vowel /e/. They are distinguished from each other by a high tone on the first syllable of the "future" form. The imperative form normally has a stem-final vowel /a/ or /u/.

Some verbs also have a plural form indicated by a suffix /-wi/ or a devoiced initial consonant. The plural form of the verb can indicate the plurality of an action, a plural intransitive subject, or a plural object. Verbs can also be modified by adverbs, including a class of ideophones, by a "ventive" marker (derived from the verb "come") following the verb, or an "inceptive" marker (derived from the verb "leave") preceding the verb.

Pronouns

The reference system makes a 10-way distinction. Gender is distinguished in second and third person singular pronouns. The first person non-singular pronouns include a dual inclusive form, a plural inclusive form, and a plural exclusive form. The plural inclusive form is a bimorphemic pronoun which combines the first person dual inclusive form with the second person plural form.

Word order

In a pragmatically neutral sentence, nominal arguments occur in a SVO word order. However, third person subject pronouns usually follow the verb.

References

Bibliography
 Cope, Pamela Simons. 1993. The plural in Lele. JWAL 23(1)
 Cope, Pamela Simons and Donald A. Burquest. 1986. Some comments on nasalization in Lele. JWAL 16(2)
 
 Frajzyngier, Zygmunt. 1995. Two complementizers in Lele. In Ibriszimow, Dymitr and Leger, Rudolf (eds.), Studia chadica et hamitosemitica: Akten des internationalen Symposions zur Tschadsprachenforschung Johann Wolfgang Goethe-Universität, Frankfurt am Main, 6.-8. Mai 1991, 163-170. Köln: Rüdiger Köppe Verlag.
 Frajzyngier, Zygmunt. 2001. A grammar of Lele. Stanford: CSLI Publications.
 Lami, Pierre. 1942. Etude succincte de la langue lélé et du dialecte nantchoa. Beirut: Imprimérie Catholique. 197pp.
 Lami, Pierre. 1951. Le nombre et le genre dans la langue lélé. In Comptes rendus du première conférence international des africanistes de l'ouest, Dakar 1945, 197-208. Dakar: Inst. Français de l'Afrique Noire (IFAN).
 Simons, Pamela. 1982. Nè... be marking in Lele: a cleft construction. Studies in African Linguistics 13. 217-229.

External links

Languages of Chad
East Chadic languages